Apalachia Dam is a hydroelectric dam on the Hiwassee River in Cherokee County, in the U.S. state of North Carolina. The dam is the lowermost of three dams on the river owned and operated by the Tennessee Valley Authority, which built the dam in the early 1940s to provide emergency power for aluminum production during World War II. The dam and associated infrastructure were listed on the National Register of Historic Places in 2017.

Apalachia Dam is named for the crossroads community of Old Apalachia, located near the dam site in North Carolina, and the community's L&N railroad stop, known simply as Apalachia, which was further downstream on the Tennessee side of the state line.

Location
The dam is situated near the center of a scenic and relatively isolated valley sliced by the river as it winds its way through the southwestern fringe of the Blue Ridge Mountains. The Unicoi Mountains rise to the north of the dam, and the Nantahala National Forest surrounds the dam and its reservoir on all sides.

The dam's  conduit— all but  of which is underground— passes behind the cliffs on the south side of the river.

Capacity

A  steel penstock connects the reservoir intake at the dam site to the  conduit. The conduit emerges from a cliffside overlooking the dam's powerhouse, where it splits into two smaller tunnels which carry the water to a valve house. From the valve house, the water drops  through two steel penstocks to the powerhouse turbines below.

Background and construction

Private and public entities had been aware of the hydroelectric potential of the Hiwassee River since the early 1900s.  The U.S. Army Corps of Engineers identified several potential dams sites, including Apalachia, in the 1920s, and by the time the Tennessee Valley Authority was formed in 1933, several companies had bought up land and flowage rights in the Hiwassee Valley.  TVA took the initiative in the valley, however, with the construction of Hiwassee Dam in the late 1930s.  By 1941, the outbreak of World War II in Europe brought a drastic increase in the demand for electricity— especially to support aluminum production in the Tennessee Valley— and TVA quickly put together a plan to build several new dams, including Apalachia, all of which were authorized July 16, 1941.  Work began on Apalachia the following day.

After the initial purchase, the Hiwassee-Nolichucky Power Company sold TVA an additional , nearly tripling the reservation size. Land for the conduit was transferred by the U.S. Forest Service.

The conduit's tunnel was built using blasting and a drill jumbo, and its   surge tank was excavated into the rock near the valve house.

Apalachia Dam was completed September 15, 1942, and its gates were closed February 14, 1943.  The tunnel was completed April 1, 1943.  The dam's first generator went online September 22, 1943, and a second went online November 17 of the same year.  The total cost of the project was just over $24 million (equivalent to $ in ).

Ecology
The construction of the Apalachia Dam eliminated the natural water flow on the Hiwassee River, causing the decline of Ruth's golden aster (Pityopsis ruthii), a major reason why the plant was placed on the Endangered Species List in 1985.

See also

New Deal

References

External links

Apalachia Reservoir — official TVA site

Dams on the Hiwassee River
Tennessee Valley Authority dams
Buildings and structures in Cherokee County, North Carolina
Buildings and structures in Polk County, Tennessee
Dams in North Carolina
Hydroelectric power plants in North Carolina
Dams completed in 1943
Energy infrastructure completed in 1943
Dams on the National Register of Historic Places in North Carolina
National Register of Historic Places in Cherokee County, North Carolina
1943 establishments in North Carolina